Richard Condon (19 March 1876 – 27 December 1946) was an Australian rules footballer who played for  Collingwood and Richmond in the Victorian Football Association (VFA) and the Victorian Football League (VFL) from 1894-1900, 1902-1906 and 1908-1909.

Talent
Condon was a highly skilled player, a wiry and tenacious man of greater than average height (5'11"; 180 cm), with great speed, brilliant evasive skills, and an outstanding capacity for reading a game.

He played mainly as a "follower".

He is widely credited as the man who contributed the most to the development of the stab-kick which (once the specially designed "blunter" Sherrin Match II football was introduced into the VFL) became the central feature of the Collingwood football team's pattern of play.

An 18 August 1905 newspaper report, referring to him as "that fiery football genius Dick Condon", described his coaching style as a "combination of brimstone oratory and skilful [sic] tactics".

Physical skills
In physical terms he was an extremely flexible and well-balanced player. He was able to pick the ball up from the ground with either hand, he was able to kick place-kicks, punt-kicks, drop-kicks, and stab-kicks with either foot, and he could handball with either hand.

Abrasive nature
He was far from well-balanced in terms of his threshold for violence (which was directed at his own teammates as often as his opponents), his short temper with club officials and umpires, his view that things must always be seen from his own perspective, his intolerance of failure, and his propensity for continuously abusing umpires, all of which were continuously displayed throughout his long career.

Lifetime suspension
Halfway through the 1900 season, Condon was appointed captain of Collingwood. In his new role as captain, he gave the umpires an even harder time. 

He abused field umpire Bill Freame on 7 July 1900 continuously throughout the match against South Melbourne at the Lake Oval after a number of decisions went against the Magpies, and he was suspended for three weeks by the VFL. Two weeks later, whilst still under VFL suspension, he got into a fist-fight with teammate Arthur Robson in the middle of Collingwood's three-quarter time huddle; the pair had to be restrained by the umpires, teammates and Collingwood club officials.

On 1 September 1900, during Collingwood's second round-robin finals match against Geelong at the Corio Oval, Condon became so upset with the umpiring of Dick Gibson during the last quarter of the match that he lost his temper and signalled for his teammates to follow him off the Corio Oval, demanding that the Collingwood match committee order the Collingwood players from the field. After umpire Gibson threatened to report the entire Collingwood team for bringing the game into disrepute, the Collingwood committee refused to do so, and instead ordered Condon and the team to either return to the field, or be expelled from the club. At that stage Collingwood was a point ahead of Geelong, but Condon's behaviour so unsettled his team that it did not score again, and lost to Geelong 6.8 (44) to 4.7 (31). It was the loss in this match that eliminated Collingwood from premiership calculations in that year.

In the final match of the three round-robin match series the following week, Collingwood played against Melbourne Football Club at the Lake Oval. The field umpire for the match, Henry "Ivo" Crapp, was considered to be the most experienced umpire in the competition. After a decision went against the Magpies in the first quarter, Condon abused Crapp throughout the remainder of the match, culminating in his infamous barrage of insults involving the umpire's daughter.

He was reported for his conduct, and the VFL Investigative Committee immediately suspended Condon for life. A newspaper report of 17 September 1900 suggested that Condon would now be able to "spend the rest of his days thinking about the joy and glory of his lost future in the game", observed that 'Collingwood has turned away from him", and noted that "club discipline has outweighed any sympathy for a fallen hero", provided additional details of the incident:

Appeal and reinstatement
Over an eighteen-month period, Condon appealed against his lifetime ban on three occasions.

His last appeal was successful, and, having not played a single game in 1901, he played his first return game for Collingwood against Melbourne at the Melbourne Cricket Ground on 19 May 1902.

Senior football career
 1894-1896, 1897-1900, 1902-1906: 194 games, 115 goals for Collingwood (45 games, 14 goals in the VFA and 149 games, 101 goals in the VFL).
 At the end of the 1899 season, in the process of naming his own "champion player", the football correspondent for The Argus ("Old Boy"), selected a team of the best players of the 1899 VFL competition:Backs: Maurie Collins (Essendon), Bill Proudfoot (Collingwood), Peter Burns (Geelong); Halfbacks: Pat Hickey (Fitzroy), George Davidson (South Melbourne), Alf Wood (Melbourne); Centres: Fred Leach (Collingwood), Firth McCallum (Geelong), Harry Wright (Essendon); Wings: Charlie Pannam (Collingwood), Eddie Drohan (Fitzroy), Herb Howson (South Melbourne); Forwards: Bill Jackson (Essendon), Eddy James (Geelong), Charlie Colgan (South Melbourne); Ruck: Mick Pleass (South Melbourne), Frank Hailwood (Collingwood), Joe McShane (Geelong); Rovers: Dick Condon (Collingwood), Bill McSpeerin (Fitzroy), Teddy Rankin (Geelong).From those he considered to be the three best players — that is, Condon, Hickey, and Pleass — he selected Pat Hickey as his "champion player" of the season. ('Old Boy', "Football: A Review of the Season", (Monday, 18 September 1899), p.6).
 1899-1900: Was intermittently captain of Collingwood.
 1905-1906: Captain-Coach of Collingwood (37 games, 26 wins, 11 losses)
His abrasive character caused so much discontent at Collingwood that he was asked to leave at the end of 1906.
 1907: Spent season in Tasmania as a field umpire.
 1908-1909: 32 games, 26 goals for Richmond.
 1908-1909: Coach of Richmond (36 games, 12 wins, 24 losses) in its first two years in the VFL competition.
His abrasive character caused so much discontent at Richmond that he was asked to leave at the end of 1909.
 1910: Non-playing coach of New South Wales Football League team East Sydney.
 He was the only Collingwood ten years/100 games played/Copeland Trophy winner not to be made a life member until the 2013 Collingwood Annual General Meeting, 107 years after his last match for Collingwood and 67 years after his death. The award was accepted by his great-nephew, Bob Condon, on behalf of the Condon family.

Death
He died in Sydney on 27 December 1946.

See also
 1908 Melbourne Carnival
 The Footballers' Alphabet

Footnotes

References 
 'Follower', "The Footballers' Alphabet", The Leader, (Saturday, 23 July 1898), p.17.
 Hogan, P., The Tigers Of Old, The Richmond Football Club, (Richmond), 1996. 
 Ross, J. (ed), 100 Years of Australian Football 1897-1996: The Complete Story of the AFL, All the Big Stories, All the Great Pictures, All the Champions, Every AFL Season Reported, Viking, (Ringwood), 1996.

External links

 Australian Football League Umpires Association: Henry Crapp, VFL's First "Prince of Umpires"
 1900 Season - AFL Tables

1876 births
1946 deaths
Australian rules footballers from Melbourne
Australian Rules footballers: place kick exponents
Collingwood Football Club (VFA) players
Collingwood Football Club players
Collingwood Football Club Premiership players
Collingwood Football Club coaches
Richmond Football Club players
Richmond Football Club coaches
Two-time VFL/AFL Premiership players
People from Carlton, Victoria